Aldenhoven is a municipality in the district of Düren in the state of North Rhine-Westphalia, Germany. It is located approximately 5 km south-west of Jülich, 5 km north of Eschweiler and 20 km north-east of Aachen.

Gallery

Notable people 

 Heinrich von der Mark (1784-1865), Bavarian lieutenant-general and minister of war
 Edmund Emundts (1790-1871) Lord Mayor of Aachen
 Jürgen Fliege (born 1947), television pastor, in the 1980s evangelical pastor in Aldenhoven
 Reinhold Yabo (born 1992), German footballer

Twin Town
Aldenhoven is twinned with the French town of Albert.

References

Düren (district)